Graham Wood may refer to:

 Graham Wood (musician) (1971–2017), Australian jazz pianist
 Graham Wood (field hockey) (born 1936), Australian former field hockey player
 Graham Charles Wood (1934—2016), British corrosion scientist

See also
 Graeme Wood (disambiguation)